Odera Olivia Orji  is a Nigerian actress, film director and producer.

Career
Odera Olivia Orji's acting career started after starring in the 2012 film " Last flight to Abuja". Her career came into the limelight after she starred as the character " Peace" in the MNET Africa television series Jemeji.
She has also starred in several movies, including Obsession, The Father, Blue, Fifty, Kayanmata, Bedroom Points, and Just a Fling.
In 2018, she was nominated for the Best of Nollywood Awards for Best Kiss in a movie alongside Mawuli Gavor.

Other work fields
Olivia serve as media and creative associate at Eureka Media Services and Assistant Director, Content Development, Mind works Story Consultancy and Productions.

Selected filmography
 Kayanmata, 2020
 To Be Frank With You, 2022
 Lunch Time Heroes, 2015
 Fifty, 2015
 Colourless, 2016
 Coming to Nnewi, 2015
 Blue Collar, 2019
 Love and Pain, 2020
 Through The Wire, 2020
 The Father, 2020
 Blue, 2020
 Eyimofe (This Is My Desire), 2020
 Dark Sides, 2020
 Just a Fling, 2019
 Sergeant Tutu, 2018
 Ifemelu: something happened, 2016
 Bedroom Points, 2019
 Sapio, 2020
 Situationship, 2021
 Knockout Blessing, 2018
 Hell Mary, 2019
 Reserved Edge, 2019 
 Obsession,  2017
 Split, 2019
 Deserted, 2022

Television
 ‘Soole’, (2021)
Jemeji (2017)
Enakhe (2020)
 Newman Street, (2016)
 Afterdark, (2019)
 Calabash, (2016)
 Legal Clinic, (2015)

Director
History Of Chicken (2019)
 Family Court (2019) Co-Director

Awards and nominations

See also
 List of Nigerian film producers

References

External links
 

Nigerian film directors
Actresses from Enugu State
Nigerian women film directors
20th-century Nigerian actresses
21st-century Nigerian actresses
Living people
Year of birth missing (living people)
Nigerian film producers
Igbo actresses